Lamhaa is a 2010 Indian Hindi-language action thriller film written and directed by Rahul Dholakia. It stars Sanjay Dutt, Bipasha Basu, Anupam Kher and Kunal Kapoor in the leading roles. The film follows an Indian Army officer sent undercover to find the culprit behind extremist attacks in Kashmir, where he is helped by the daughter of a separatist leader. The film released on 16 July 2010.

Plot
Indian Military Intelligence assigns their agent, Vikram Sabharwal, to travel to Kashmir. There he is to locate the person(s) behind the violence, under the guise of a press reporter, Gul Jahangir. Once there, he begins his investigation by visiting highly sensitive areas as such as the Jama Masjid, Dardpura Village and Rainawari Chowk. He is accompanied by a tailor, Char Chinar, who sells uniforms to both militants and the military soldiers. Vikram meets up with Aziza Abbas Ansari, and her mentor, Haji Sayyed Shah, and aspiring political leader, Aatif Hussain. And it is after these meetings that he will conclude who is behind the extremism in this beautiful yet 'most dangerous place on Earth'.

Cast
 Sanjay Dutt as Vikram Sabharwal / Gul
 Bipasha Basu as Aziza
 Kunal Kapoor as Aatif
 Shernaz Patel as Parveena
 Aman Verma
 Yashpal Sharma as Rauf
 Vishwajeet Pradhan as Daljeet
 Vipin Sharma as Colonel Kapoor
 Yuri Suri as Pasha
 Anupam Kher as Haji
 Asif Basra
 Rajesh Khera as Parvez
 Murli Sharma as Dhruv Raina
 Jyoti Dogra as Badi Bi
 Denzil Smith as Brigadier Sharma
 Ehsaan Khan as S P Khan
 Mahesh Manjrekar as Peer Baba
 Harry Josh
 Vineet Sharma

Production

Casting
Karisma Kapoor was finalised to play the female lead, but she opted out at the last minute because she feared shooting in the troubled Kashmir valley where a significant part was going to be shot. Bipasha Basu, Ameesha Patel and Sonam Kapoor were considered for the same role, and Basu was finalised to play the female lead.

Filming and post-production
Filming began in Kashmir on 25 October 2008. During November 2008, Bipasha Basu left the shooting hours before Sanjay Dutt landed in Srinagar to start shooting with her — without informing the unit. They decided to shoot the action sequences in Manali instead. After her abrupt departure, producer Bunty Walia and director Rahul Dholakia asked Basu to arrive on the set on 4 January 2009 and that they would cast Vidya Balan as a replacement in case she does not comply. Basu then arrived on the specified date after security arrangements were tightened and explained that she got scared in Kashmir after the crowd gathering became uncontrollable.

In May 2009, Rahul Dholakia collapsed on the sets and shooting was delayed up to 25 May after doctors advised Dholakia bed rest for one month. Eventually the entire film was shot in sets of Kashmir erected in Film City, Mumbai, for which production designer Wasiq Khan brought in two truckloads of chinar tree leaves from Kashmir.

Critical reception
Lamhaa received mixed reviews from critics.

Sukanya Verma of Rediff rated it 3/5 and said, "Ultimately, Lamhaa's relevance lies in its ability to give you an overview, even if it's a crammed one, about the ugliness of greed and intolerance through the example of Kashmir." Noyon Jyoti Parasara of AOL rated it 3.5/5 and stated, "Very truly it does delve right into the primary problem. But this time, unlike most other movies made on the same subject, it does not stay on a superficial level." Nikhat Kazmi of Times of India rated it 3.5/5 saying, "Lamhaa is a no-holds-barred look at the multi-layered turmoil in Kashmir, with so many real-life references that you end up with just one conclusion: now here's a real film about a real problem."

Mayank Shekhar of the Hindustan Times rated it 2/5 and said, "It's not easy to make sense of Kashmir. It's harder still then to make sense of this film."

Soundtrack
The songs featured in the film are given by Mithoon with lyrics by Sayeed Quadri and Amitabh Varma.

Track listing

Controversy
Lamhaa was banned in Pakistan and all GCC countries like Saudi Arabia, Bahrain, Kuwait, Qatar, UAE and Oman. UAE National Media Council Censorship Board felt that the content of the movie is highly objectionable and controversial.

Earlier, the film's screening was cancelled in Kashmir amid the tense atmosphere. The producer didn't want to be insensitive to the sentiments of the Kashmiri people. The producer, Walia, commented, "There are no scenes that they want me to remove from the film. They have outrightly refused to screen Lamhaa. [...] This news has really dampened my spirits. The Middle East is a huge market for Bollywood movies these days, and we could suffer a huge setback because of this ban. There is definitely a lot of money at stake that could have been recovered from that region, but more than that, I am sad that the audience there can't see a film like 'Lamhaa'."

The Indian censor board passed the movie with an A certificate after two edits were made.

Accolades

References

External links
 
 

2010s Hindi-language films
2010 action thriller films
2010 films
Films set in Jammu and Kashmir
Films shot in Mumbai
Films directed by Rahul Dholakia
Indian action thriller films
Films scored by Sanjoy Chowdhury
Kashmir conflict in films
Film controversies in the United Arab Emirates